George Mifflin Bache, Jr. (November 12, 1841 – February 11, 1896)  was an officer in the United States Navy, fighting on the Union side in the American Civil War and continuing to serve for a decade after the war's end. The Fletcher-class destroyer  was named for him.

Early life and ancestors
He was born in Washington, D.C., to Lt. George Mifflin Bache, USN, and Elizabeth Catherine Patterson. He was the grandson of Richard Bache, Jr., who served in the Republic of Texas navy and was an elected representative in the Texas legislature, and Sophia Burrell Dallas, daughter of Arabella Maria Smith and Alexander James Dallas, who served as the U.S. Treasury Secretary under President James Madison.

He was also a great-grandson of Sarah Franklin Bache and Richard Bache, and a great-great-grandson of Benjamin Franklin, as well as a nephew of George Mifflin Dallas, the 11th Vice President of the United States, serving under James K. Polk.

His uncles included Alexander Dallas Bache, Superintendent of the United States Coast Survey, and Admiral David Dixon Porter.

Education and career
His father was killed in 1846, swept overboard during a gale while in command of the brig , but despite this Bache joined the Navy in August 1855, serving as captain's clerk aboard the sloop  until May 1857. He then briefly served aboard the U.S. Coast Survey schooner , as acting-master's mate under the command of Lieutenant Richard Wainwright, another uncle by marriage, before entering the Naval Academy on November 19, 1857, with the rank of acting-midshipman. He graduated on June 1, 1861, just after the outbreak of the Civil War, with the rank of midshipman.

Civil War and later life
During the war, he first served aboard . Promoted to lieutenant on July 16, 1862, he served briefly in the steam sloop  before transferring to the squadron on the Mississippi River late in 1862. On November 8, 1862, he received orders to assume command of the stern-wheel casemate gunboat . Bache commanded the gunboat during operations leading up to the fall of Vicksburg, Mississippi, early in July 1863. During those operations, however, his ship was sunk on May 27, 1863, while dueling Confederate batteries defending the river approaches to the city.

That summer, he took command of the sidewheel gunboat  and led her in a number of engagements with Confederate forces. In 1864, he returned to the Atlantic blockade as executive officer of Powhatan. While assigned to that ship, Bache participated in both the unsuccessful and successful assaults on Fort Fisher, carried out in December 1864 and January 1865. In the latter attack, he was wounded but not severely.

Promoted to lieutenant-commander on July 25, 1866, he served in  until she was destroyed on a reef at the mouth of the Godavari River, Madras, India, on June 19, 1867. Between 1869 and 1872, Bache was assigned to the steam sloop  on the European Station. After that, he went ashore to ordnance duty at the Washington Navy Yard until his retirement on April 5, 1875, receiving promotion to commander the same day.

Commander Bache was married to the former Harriet DuBois (1849–1931); they had three daughters and perhaps other offspring.

Bache died on February 11, 1896, at Washington, D.C.

The destroyer  (1942–1968) was named in his honor.

References

External links
Commander George Mifflin Bache, USN, an inventory of his collection in the Navy Department Library
George Mifflin Bache Papers, 1821-1917, 1952, 1968 MS 212 and George M. Bache Journal of the U.S.S. Plymouth, 1860, MS 10 held by Special Collection & Archives , Nimitz Library  at the United States Naval Academy

1841 births
1896 deaths
People of Washington, D.C., in the American Civil War
Union Navy officers
Franklin family